This is a list of VTV dramas released in 1996.

←1995 - 1996 - 1997→

VTV Tet dramas
These films were released on VTV channel during Tet holiday. In this time, all of the channels were merged with a single broadcast schedule.

Vietnamese dramas on VTV1 night time slot
Several Vietnamese dramas was released on VTV1 night time slot but there was no recurring broadcast schedule. The list below includes all of Vietnamese films and dramas aired in this time slot during the year.

Unstable time slot on Wednesday night
Since late 1996, Vietnamese dramas tend to be aired on Wednesday night more often. This continues to the next year.

VTV3 Sunday Literature & Art dramas
These dramas air in early Sunday afternoon as a part of the program Sunday Literature & Art (Vietnamese: Văn nghệ Chủ Nhật).

Starting from March 31, the program was moved from VTV1 to VTV3 as soon as the latter channel was officially launched.

Note: The airtime with an asterisk (*) at the end indicates that the broadcast order is undefined

See also
 List of dramas broadcast by Vietnam Television (VTV)
 List of dramas broadcast by Hanoi Radio Television (HanoiTV)
 List of dramas broadcast by Vietnam Digital Television (VTC)

References

External links
VTV.gov.vn – Official VTV Website 
VTV.vn – Official VTV Online Newspaper 

Vietnam Television original programming
1996 in Vietnamese television